Vahni Anthony Ezekiel Capildeo (born
Surya Vahni Priya Capildeo; born 1973) is a Trinidad and Tobago-born British writer, and a member of the extended Capildeo family that has produced notable Trinidadian politicians and writers (including V. S. Naipaul, a cousin of Capildeo's, and Neil Bissoondath).

Biography
Born in 1973 in Port of Spain, Trinidad, Capildeo has lived in the United Kingdom since 1991. Capildeo is agender.

They read English at Christ Church, Oxford, and were subsequently awarded a Rhodes Scholarship to pursue graduate work in Old Norse and translation theory, also at Christ Church/the Faculty of English Language and Literature, towards their DPhil, Reading Egils saga Skallagrímssonar: saga, paratext, translations (2001). 

They intermitted from a Research Fellowship at Girton College, Cambridge, in 2000–04 to spend time in Trinidad and Jamaica. This produced No Traveller Returns (Salt, 2003), a book-length poem sequence characterised by a reviewer as "a discontinuous meditation on identity and self-awareness. These are merciless poems – mercilessly observant, mercilessly precise", and One Scattered Skeleton, a non-fiction book on the palimpsestic nature of place, memory, and language that takes its title from a poem by the Guyanese poet Martin Carter and moves between the UK, the Caribbean, and Iceland. Extracts from One Scattered Skeleton have appeared in London: City of Disappearances (ed. Iain Sinclair), Stand Magazine, The Arts Journal (Guyana) and The Caribbean Review of Books.

Person Animal Figure, a set of 45 dramatic monologues in three voices, was published by Jeremy Noel-Tod's Landfill Press in 2005 (http://www.landfillpress.co.uk).

Undraining Sea (completed 2005), a third poetry collection, was published in 2009. Described in one review as "a wholly recommendable collection", it is a three-section book that actively engages with William Carlos Williams's Paterson. This was followed in 2012 by Dark and Unaccustomed Words (completed 2008), which takes its title from George Puttenham's 16th-century Arte of Poesie. This was Puttenham's critical term for arcane or foreign imports into English. The collection was longlisted for the OCM Bocas Prize for Caribbean Literature. These poems demonstrate, for example, the feeling and scope of certain parts of speech (prepositions, adjectives), forms, voices, or attitudes.
Rights for both books (originally published by Eggbox) have reverted to the author.

A fifth book, Utter, was published by Peepal Tree Press in 2013. Reviewing the collection in The Caribbean Review of Books, Vivek Narayanan wrote: "What we have here is not a set of conceits, or even concerns, but a system and a mythos entire, one that is delivered to us with such continuous and consistent lyrical intensity, both classical and contemporary, that it can appear as fissures of lightning on the page." David Caddy in the magazine Tears in the Fence said: "Reading Vahni Capildeo’s Utter ... is an absolute joy, displaying the range and registers that the best of contemporary poetry should exhibit more fully. Capildeo is both Trinidadian and universal."

Simple Complex Shapes, published by Tony Frazer's Shearsman Books in 2015, was written during Capildeo's time as the Judith E. Wilson Poetry Fellow in the Faculty of English, University of Cambridge. Jamie Osborn notes that this work " can be taken as a sequence of poems or one long poem describing a series of flights and falls from the moment of a touch in the dark through a day or days, a tangle of time, back into a dreaming sleep."

Capildeo has worked at Oxfam Head Office and for the Oxford Sexual Abuse and Rape Crisis Centre as a volunteer and a volunteer trainer; for the Oxford English Dictionary; and they have taught at the Universities of Leeds (2009), Greenwich (2009), Sheffield (2009–10), Kingston upon Thames (2010–11), and Glasgow (2012–13). They are a Contributing Editor at the Caribbean Review of Books (edited by Nicholas Laughlin). They were part of the team of Commonwealth Writers, the cultural initiative of the Commonwealth Foundation, in 2013–14. They held the 2014 Judith E. Wilson Visiting Fellowship in Poetry at the University of Cambridge and the 2015 Harper-Wood Studentship at St John's College, Cambridge. Capildeo was a Douglas Caster Cultural Fellow in Poetry at the University of Leeds, 2017–19 and is the 2019–2020 Seamus Heaney Centre Fellow in Poetry at Queen's University Belfast.

In 2014, Capildeo served as a judge for the Forward Prize and won the Forward Prize for Poetry for Best Collection in 2016.

Awards
In 2016, Capildeo became the third Caribbean poet in a row – after Jamaican-born poets Kei Miller and Claudia Rankine – to win the Forward Prize for best poetry collection, with Measures of Expatriation. The Chair of the Forward jury, Malika Booker, said: "Vahni Capildeo’s Measure of Expatriation is a work that amazes. We found a vertiginous excitement in the way in which the book grasps its subject: the sense of never quite being at home. This is poetry that transforms. When people in the future seek to know what it's like to live between places, traditions, habits and cultures, they will read this. Here is the language for what expatriation feels like."

In 2019, Capildeo was elected a Fellow of the Royal Society of Literature.

Bibliography
 No Traveller Returns. Salt Publishing, 2003. 
 Person Animal Figure. Landfill Press, 2005.
 Undraining Sea. Egg Box Publishing, 2009.  [rights reverted to author]
 All Your Houses. Alice Yard, 2011.
 Dark and Unaccustomed Words, Egg Box Publishing, 2012.  [rights reverted to author]
 Utter. Peepal Tree Press, 2013. 
 Simple Complex Shapes. Shearsman Books, 2015. 
 Measures of Expatriation, Carcanet Press, January 2016. 
Seas and Trees, Recent Work Press, 2017.
 Venus as a Bear, Carcanet Press, 2018.
 Skin Can Hold, Carcanet Press, 2019.
 Odyssey Calling, Sad Press, 2020.
 Light Site, Periplum, 2020.
 The Dusty Angel, Oystercatcher, 2021.
 Like a Tree, Walking, Carcanet, 2021.

References

External links
Vahni Capildeo reads poetry at PoetCasting
Zannab Sheikh, Vahni Capildeo interview, I Don't Call Myself a Poet, 15 August 2012.
"Vahni Capildeo", The Spaces between Words.
Vahni Capildeo at PN Review.
"Vahni Capildeo", Poetry International Web, Rotterdam, 1 November 2006.
Nicholas Laughlin (in conversation with Vahni Capildeo), "The Liberty of the Imagination", MaComère 13.1&2 (2011–2012): 34–49.
 "'In the Trinidad of my childhood, there was a delight in language well used'" (interview), Global.

1973 births
Living people
Trinidad and Tobago non-fiction writers
Trinidad and Tobago poets
Trinidad and Tobago women poets
Trinidad and Tobago people of Indian descent
Trinidad and Tobago Hindus
Fellows of Girton College, Cambridge
Alumni of Christ Church, Oxford
Caribbean Rhodes Scholars
Trinidad and Tobago emigrants to the United Kingdom
British people of Indo-Trinidadian descent
People from Port of Spain
Non-binary writers
Naipaul family
Agender people